Sidney Leviss (July 21, 1917 - September 7, 2007) was a Democratic politician and judge from Queens, New York City.

Biography
Leviss was born in Flushing, New York. He attended New York University and received a degree from the New York University School of Law in June 1941. Leviss was admitted to the New York State Bar in January 1942. The next day he joined the U.S. Army Air Corps to fight in World War II.

After the war he served as an assistant district attorney under T. Vincent Quinn, and later as deputy Queens borough president under Mario J. Cariello. He succeeded his boss and was elected Queens borough president in 1969. Leviss left the office mid-term on September 17, 1971 to take a seat on the New York Supreme Court. He retired from the bench at the age of 76, but was subsequently named a judicial hearing officer, a position he held until his death.

Leviss' wife Marion died in 2006. He was survived by two daughters, Jeanne and Nancy.

References 

1917 births
2007 deaths
Jewish American people in New York (state) politics
Queens borough presidents
New York University School of Law alumni
20th-century American Jews
21st-century American Jews
People from Flushing, Queens
Politicians from Queens, New York